Hari Pratap Gautam, commonly Hari Gautam, is a cardiac surgeon currently serving as chancellor of the Shri Lal Bahadur Shastri National Sanskrit University, who also served as the 20th and former vice-chancellor of the Banaras Hindu University(1995–98).

Career 
Hari Gautam has previously served as the vice-chancellor of King George's Medical University, president of National Academy of Medical Sciences, chairman of the University Grants Commission (1999-2002), and the 20th vice-chancellor of Banaras Hindu University (1995–98).

See also 

 List of vice-chancellors of Banaras Hindu University

References 

Vice Chancellors of Banaras Hindu University
Living people
Indian academic administrators
Year of birth missing (living people)